Disko may refer to:

Disko Island or Qeqertarsuaq, in Baffin Bay, Greenland
Disko, Indiana, a small town in the United States
The character Disko Troop in the book Captains Courageous
Disk'O, a type of amusement ride manufactured by Zamperla
Disko (song), a song by Last Pizza Slice that was the Slovenian entry in the Eurovision Song Contest 2022

See also
Disco